The 1923 Irish general election to elect the 4th Dáil was held on Monday, 27 August, following the dissolution of the Third Dáil on 9 August 1923. It was the first general election held since the establishment of the Irish Free State on 6 December 1922. The election was held shortly after the end of the Irish Civil War in May 1923. Many of the Republican TDs, who represented the losing anti-Treaty side, were still imprisoned during and after the election and had committed to not participating in the Dáil if elected.

The 4th Dáil assembled at Leinster House on 19 September to nominate the President of the Executive Council and Executive Council of the Irish Free State for appointment by the Governor-General. Cumann na nGaedheal, the successor to the Pro-Treaty wing of Sinn Féin, won the election and formed the government.

Legal background
It was the first general election fought since the establishment of the Irish Free State and the adoption of the Constitution of the Irish Free State on 6 December 1922. It was contested under the Electoral Act 1923, which increased the seats in the Dáil from 128 to 153, and introduced a franchise of all citizens over the age of 21, without distinction of sex. Lax electoral practices were tightened up by The Prevention of Electoral Abuses Act 1923.

Result

|}

Most parties made gains, in part because the total number of seats in the Dáil was increased by 25 from 128 to 153.

Voting summary

Seats summary

Government formation
The Republican TDs continued to abstain from the Dáil. Therefore, Cumann na nGaedheal had a majority of seats which were taken in the Dáil and formed the 2nd Executive Council of the Irish Free State on 19 September 1923.

Changes in membership

First time TDs
Frank Aiken
Patrick Baxter
Dan Breen
Frank Cahill
John James Cole
Margaret Collins-O'Driscoll
Cornelius Connolly
Edward Doyle
Peadar Doyle
Seán Gibbons
Kathleen Lynn
Patrick McFadden
James Myles
Michael Shelly
Paddy Smith

Retiring TDs
Gerald Fitzgibbon
Joseph Whelehan

Defeated TDs
Walter L. Cole
Robert Day
Patrick Gaffney

References

Notes

Sources

Citations

1923 elections in Europe
1923 in Irish politics
General election, 1923
1923
4th Dáil
August 1923 events
General